The 1941 Cork Senior Football Championship was the 53rd staging of the Cork Senior Football Championship since its establishment by the Cork County Board in 1887. The draw for the opening round fixtures took place on 26 January 1941. The championship began on 6 April 1941 and ended on 18 January 1942.

Beara entered the championship as the defending champions.

On 18 January 1942, St. Nicholas' won the championship following a 1-08 to 1-05 defeat of Millstreet in the final. This was their second championship title and their first title since 1938.

Results

First round

 Millstreet received a bye in this round.

Second round

Quarter-finals

Semi-finals

Final

Championship statistics

Miscellaneous

 St. Nicholas' sister club Glen Rovers also won the Cork Hurling Championship to complete the double.

References

Cork Senior Football Championship